Paul Robert Chernoff (21 June 1942,  Philadelphia – 17 January 2017)  was an American mathematician, specializing in functional analysis and the mathematical foundations of quantum mechanics. He is known for Chernoff's Theorem, a mathematical result in the Feynman path integral formulation of quantum mechanics.

Education and career
Chernoff graduated from Central High School in Philadelphia. He matriculated at Harvard University, where he received bachelor's degree summa cum laude in 1963, master's degree in 1965, and Ph.D. in 1968 under George Mackey with thesis Semigroup Product Formulas and Addition of Unbounded Operators.

At the University of California, Berkeley he became in 1969 a lecturer, in 1971 an assistant professor, and in 1980 a full professor. U. C. Berkeley awarded him multiple Distinguished Teaching Awards and the Lili Fabilli and Eric Hoffer Essay Prize. In 1986 he was a visiting professor at the University of Pennsylvania.

Chernoff was elected in 1984 a Fellow of the American Association for the Advancement of Science and in 2012 a Fellow of the American Mathematical Society.

He gave in 1981 a simplified proof of the Groenewold-Van Hove theorem, which is a no-go theorem that relates classical mechanics to quantum mechanics.

Selected publications
Note on product formulas for operator semigroups, J. Funct. Analysis, vol. 2, 1968, pp. 238–242 
with Richard Anthony Rasala and William C. Waterhouse: The Stone-Weierstrass theorem for valuable fields Pacific Journal of Mathematics vol. 27, no. 2, 1968, pp. 233–240
Some remarks on quasi-analytic vectors, Trans. Amer. Math. Soc. vol. 167, 1972, pp. 105–113 
Representations, automorphisms, and derivations of some operator algebras, J. Funct. Analysis, vol. 12, 1973, pp. 275–289 
Essential self-adjointness of powers of generators of hyperbolic equations, J. Funct. Analysis, vol. 12, 1973, pp. 401–414 
Product formulas, nonlinear semigroups, and addition of unbounded operators, American Mathematical Society 1974.
with Jerrold Marsden: Properties of infinite dimensional Hamiltonian systems, Springer 1974
Understanding mathematical proofs: Conceptual barriers. Science vol. 193, no. 4250, 1976, p. 276
The quantum n-body problem and a theorem of Littlewood, Pacific J. Math., vol. 70, 1977, pp. 117–123
Irreducible representations of infinite-dimensional transformation groups and Lie algebras, I. J. Funct. Anal., vol. 130, 1995, pp. 255–282 
with Rhonda Hughes: "A new class of point interactions in one dimension." Journal of functional analysis, vol. 111, no. 1, 1993, pp. 97–117 
with R. Hughes: Some examples related to Kato's conjecture. J. Austral. Math. Soc. Ser. A, vol. 60, 1996, pp. 274–286. 
Quantization and irreducible representations of infinite-dimensional transformation groups and Lie algebras. In: Proceedings of the Symposium on Mathematical Physics and Quantum Field Theory (Berkeley, CA, 1999), Eletron. J. Differ. Equ. Conf., vol. 4, 2000, pp. 17–22
A pseudo zeta function and the distribution of primes, Proc. Natl. Acad. Sci. USA, vol.  97, 2000, pp. 7697–7699  (There is a typographical error: "One can show that C(s) may be analytically continued at least into the half-plane Re s > 0 except for an isolated singularity (presumably a simple pole) at s = 0." This should be "at s = 1" according to the mathematical argument given.)

References

1942 births
2017 deaths
20th-century American mathematicians
21st-century American mathematicians
Mathematical analysts
Central High School (Philadelphia) alumni
Harvard College alumni
University of California, Berkeley College of Letters and Science faculty
Fellows of the American Association for the Advancement of Science
Fellows of the American Mathematical Society
Harvard Graduate School of Arts and Sciences alumni